Sari Gelin or Sari Aghjik is the name for a number of folk songs popular among the people of Iran, the southern Caucasus (most prominently present-day Azerbaijan and Armenia) and in eastern Anatolia in present-day Turkey. All versions of the song use the same melody and are written in the Bayati makam or mode, but are sung with different lyrics. The consensus about its country of origin is contested.

Sari Gelin is either a blond bride or a girl from the mountains, depending on the respective lyric language. What the versions have in common, is a boy complaining to/about a girl he loves but cannot achieve.

Etymology
Sarı as a Turkic adjective means "yellow". Thus Sarı Gelin can mean "golden/blond/fair-skinned bride." In Azerbaijani language it may also refer to a person's soul. The word gelin in Turkish or gəlin in Azerbaijani means someone who comes to the family (i.e. a bride), with its root in the Turkic word gel (meaning "come").

In Armenian, the song is known as Sari Aghjik, where the word sari (սարի) means "of the mountain", and the word "aghjik", with an equal syllable number, means "girl". Together they mean "girl/bride from the mountains".

Versions 
All versions of Sari Gelin-Sari Aghjik use the same melody and are written in the literary genre known as Bayati, which is one of the most popular forms of poetry in most of the Middle East. Bayati poetry is known for its reflective and introspective prose. Generally, Bayati poetry consists of lines of seven syllables written in a simple rhythm. However, There are many different lyrical interpretations of Sari Gelin among Armenians, Azerbaijanis, Georgians, Persians, and Turks. The song is a subject of contention and accusations of plagiarism among the countries where it is popular. At the moment, there is no consensus about its country of origin.

Armenian Sari Aghjik 

The Sari Aghjik (Mountain Girl) version uses the same melody with the Armenian word for the girl (aghjik աղջիկ) as in the song Vard Siretsi ("I loved a rose"). The lyrics translate to:

The phrase "Don't pour poison into (salt on) my wound" is an idiom that means "don't make my troubles worse".

Azerbaijani Sarı Gəlin 

In Azerbaijan, Sarı Gəlin (Blond Maiden) is a legend that symbolizes the love between a Muslim Azerbaijani and a Christian Kipchak girl who are kept apart. "seni mene vermezler" ("They will not give you to me") is a reference to this story.
The lyrics
translate to:

The Azerbaijani version of the song was processed and pitched by Azerbaijani composer Asaf Zeynally (1909–1932).
There is also an Azerbaijani folk dance called Sari Gelin. This folk dance is performed under the music of Azerbaijani version Sari Gelin song with Azerbaijani instruments.

The text of the song in Azerbaijani language was published in 1982 in Baku under the edition of Hamid Arasly. In 2001 the Azerbaijani text of the song was published by Rafik Babayev.
The Azerbaijani version by the Iranian Hossein Alizadeh and the Armenian Jivan Gasparyan sometimes use the Turkish line "Sarı Gəlin aman!"; and finish with the first stanza of the Persian version.

Azerbaijani long version 
DayIrMan sings a longer Azerbaijani version, which translates to:

Turkish Sarı Gelin

Kurdish Ser Le Ser Ranî 
There are versions of this song in Sorani, the Kurdish language that is predominantly spoken in Iran and Iraqi Kurdistan. One of these versions was performed by Mohammad Mamle, a well-known Kurdish singer.

Persian Dāman Kešān
The Persian version is entitled Dāman Kešān or Sāqi e Mey Xārān.

Greek  Απ΄ τον Έρωτα στον Αχέροντα 
The composer of the music is anonymous. The Greek lyrics were written by Christos C. Papadopoulos.

Parallels 
While the Persian version is completely different, there are notable similarities between Armenian, Azerbaijani and Turkish version:
 The girl is from mountainous regions. The Turkish version boy encounters the girl in Erzurum market and suggests that she is from Palandöken mountain. The Armenian version girl is "sari" (from the mountain). and the Azerbaijani version boy calls the girl "tallest in the valley" and "sheperd".
 The girl is blond. In Azerbaijani and Turkish versions "Sari" means yellow. in the Azerbaijani version, where the story is about a Muslim boy in love with a Christian girl, It makes sense for "Sari" to mean blond, as it is a notable characteristic among predominantly dark haired people.
 The girl is tall, as Azerbaijani "uzunu" (the tallest) and Turkish "suna" (male duck. here: tall and beautiful) correspond.
 The boy says "aman!". The Arabic word "aman" (secure me / help / please) is an exclamation of lasting pain and long distress. It is used in Azerbaijani "neynim aman, aman" (what do I do? please!), Turkish "Leylim aman" (my Leyli, please!) and Armenian "dle aman" (my heart, please!).
 The boy and the girl are apart as told in Azerbaijani story, Azerbaijani line "seni mene vermezler" (They won't give you to me / let me marry you), Armenian Sari Gyalin line "I could not have the one I loved". Turkish line "I won't give you [up] to others" and In Armenian Sari Aghjik line "She left and chose someone else".
 The girl is called Leyli in Turkish line "leylim aman aman" (my leyli, please!) and the Armenian Sari Aghjik line "Leyli janin yar" (Leyla dear beloved). but this particular line is a Persian phrase referring to Layla the famous beloved. This can mean:
 The girl is beloved, as Leyli is the famous object of desire.
 The girl's name is Leyli.
 The girl is insanely loved, but is impossible to get; especially if similarity to Romeo & Juliet is noticed, as widely done by Turks.
 The boy says "may your grandmother die" in Armenian and Turkish versions. It may be:
 A curse.
 That grandmother might have a real role in parting the lovers.
 The girl may have been taken away from the boy, and even given to someone else: In the last part of Turkish lyric found in some sources, the boy says "I won't give you [up] to others", and in some of its variations, the girl writes the boy's death sentence. In the Persian version the girl is unkind and flees away. Both Armenian versions, are about the boy complaining that the unkind girl has rejected her. In Armenian Sari Aghjik, the girl has chosen someone else over him.

If the statements are taken as complementary rather than just similar, the Muslim Turk (language of both Azerbaijan and Turkey) boy has fallen in love with a Christian Armenian/Kipchak blond maiden from the mountains and valleys, probably close to Palandöken; But they are kept apart, and the unkind girl is taken away, causing the boy to lament and curse frequently.

Cultural impact
In Armenia
 In the twentieth century Pavel Lisitsian, the Armenian-Soviet opera singer and national artist of the USSR interpreted his own version of the folk song in the Armenian language.<
 In 2013 Armenian singer Andre, who represented Armenia at the Eurovision Song Contest 2006 released his version of "Sari Aghjik" (Սարի աղջիկ) and a music video for the song.
 Armenian recording artist Emmy, who was the Armenian representative at the Eurovision Song Contest 2011 released her own version of the song and shot a music video for it in 2014.
 In 2016, Sona Rubenyan, the winner of the fifth edition of the Armenian television hit show Hay Superstar, performed her version of the song in Armenian during Arena Live TV show.
 In 2016, the folk group Gata Band (also participants in Armenia's national selection for Eurovision Song Contest 2018) performed their version of the song in Armenian.
 On May 31, 2020, Garik and Sona released their version of the song in Armenian and a music video.
 In 2020, the melody of "Sari Aghjik" was used as a soundtrack for Armenia TV's television series of the same name.

In Azerbaijan
 The story was retold by the prominent early 20th Century Azerbaijani poet and playwright Huseyn Javid in his play Sheikh Sanan featuring a Muslim boy and a Christian girl.
 The story has also been adapted into a film directed by Yaver Rzayev called Sari Gelin (1999); which was Azerbaijan's first feature film, shown in 2000 at the London and Karlovy Vary Film Festivals. It is about the country's fight with Armenia. The protagonist, is a boy named Gadir. He has a vision of a bride dressed in yellow, which in both cultures is a symbol of death and the cruelties of fate.
 There is an Azerbaijani musical ensemble called "Sari Gelin";
 Azerbaijani artist Safura, who was the Azerbaijani representative at the Eurovision Song Contest 2010 released her own version of the song.
 Latvian artist Anmary, who was the Latvian representative at the Eurovision Song Contest 2012 during her visit in Azerbaijan also released her own version of the song and shot a music video for it in 2012 in Baku.
 On 18 December 2013 during a concert of Italian singers, at the Baku Crystal Hall, one of the most popular Italian singers Toto Cutugno sang "Sari Gelin" in Azerbaijani language.
 On 23 November 2014 during the concert Lara Fabian, which was held at the Heydar Aliyev Palace, sang Sari Gelin in Azerbaijani.
 In 2014 Azerbaijani-British singer Sami Yusuf sang and released versions of "Sari Gelin" in Azerbaijani and English.
 In 2014 Azerbaijani dancer Oksana Rasulova presented music video "Sari Gelin".

In Iran
 The Persian version was performed by Viguen, who was a prominent Iranian pop and jazz singer of Armenian descent.
 A Central Kurdish version of the song was performed by Mohammad Mamle, a well-known musician, singer and political activist from Mahabad.
 The song was featured in 2006 collaboration album Endless Vision by eminent musicians Djivan Gasparyan and Hossein Alizadeh, which was nominated for a Grammy Award for Best Traditional World Music Album at the 49th Grammy Awards. The album was recorded at the Niavaran Palace of Tehran, and was released through Hermes Records (Iran) and World Village (United States).

In Turkey
 The Turkish multiethnic / multicultural group Kardeş Türküler recorded it as "Sari Gyalin (Dağlı Gelin)" in their 1997 self-titled album Kardeş Türküler on Kalan Ses Görüntü label.
 A controversial documentary with the same title as the song (due to it being linked to Armenians in Turkey) was distributed in Turkish schools that shows denial of the Armenian Genocide. It received several criticism.
In 2017, Cem Adrian released a video on YouTube singing this song recorded live in 2010.

International
 In 2014, British-Azerbaijani Muslim singer Sami Yusuf recorded a bilingual version, mainly in English but ending with Azerbaijani lyrics on his 2014 album The Centre released on Andante Records.

See also
 Suzan Suzi
 Ahcik
 Karadır kaşların ferman yazdırır
 Gelin Ayşe

References

External links

Armenian folk songs
Azerbaijani folk songs
Turkish folk songs